The Battle of Shumshu, the Soviet invasion of Shumshu in the Kuril Islands, was the first stage of the Soviet Union's Invasion of the Kuril Islands in August–September 1945 during World War II. It took place from 18 to 23 August 1945, and was the only major battle of the Soviet campaign in the Kuril Islands and one of the last battles of the war.

Background
The Soviet Union and Japan maintained a fairly scrupulous neutrality toward each other after signing the Soviet–Japanese Neutrality Pact on 13 April 1941, although the two countries were allied with each other′s World War II enemies from 1941 until the conclusion of the war in 1945. The Soviet Union turned down Allied requests for any actions which might provoke Japan, but discussed plans to base American aircraft on Soviet territory for operations against Japan after the Soviet Union had declared war on Japan.

Joseph Stalin said that the Soviet entry into the war against Japan would not be possible until after a three-month period following Germany's defeat, per an assurance he offered to the United States Ambassador to the Soviet Union, W. Averell Harriman, at an October 1944 meeting. Stalin further stipulated as part of the agreement that it would include the Allies providing substantial assistance to the Soviet Union in building up its armed forces and military supplies in East Asia and the Pacific in advance of any Soviet operations against Japan. The United States soon began the work of meeting the Soviet requirements outside of and in addition to annual Lend-Lease allotments of aid to the Soviets, including the transfer of a dozen types of ships and aircraft from the United States to the Soviet armed forces. In the spring and summer of 1945, the United States secretly transferred 149 ships and craft – mostly escort vessels, landing craft, and minesweepers – to the Soviet Navy at Cold Bay in the Territory of Alaska in Project Hula. Even so, cooperation between the Soviets and Americans was minimal and in August 1945 the Soviets did not have the capability to mount a major sea-borne invasion of Japanese-held territory.

As Stalin had promised, the Soviet Union declared war against Japan on 8 August 1945, exactly three months after the capitulation of Germany, and began an offensive against Japanese forces in Northeast Asia the next day. During August, Soviet forces attacked Japanese forces in the puppet state of Manchukuo in Manchuria, in the Japanese province of Karafuto on the southern half of Sakhalin Island, and the northern half of Korea, a Japanese possession at the time. Another Soviet goal during the offensive was the occupation of the Kuril Islands.

Preparations
On 15 August 1945, the commander-in-chief of Soviet armed forces in the Soviet Far East, Marshal of the Soviet Union Aleksandr M. Vasilevsky, ordered the commander of the Soviet Armys Second Far Eastern Front, General Maksim A. Purkayev, and the commander of the Soviet Navys Pacific Ocean Fleet, Admiral Ivan S. Yumashev, to take the first step in the conquest of the Kuril Islands by occupying the islands of Shumshu and Paramushiro at the northern end of the archipelago, just off the southern tip of the Soviet Unions Kamchatka Peninsula. Soviet forces first were to take Shumshu, then Paramushiro; with these two islands under control, the rest of the island chain, which was only lightly held, would fall easily.

Purkayev and Yumashev placed the commander of the Soviet Armys Kamchatka Defense Zone, General A. R. Gnechko, and the commander of the naval base at Petropavlovsk-Kamchatsky, Captain 1st Rank Dmitri G. Ponomarev, in charge of the Shumshu operation, with Gnechko in overall command. Gnechko and Pomomarev had orders to assemble an assault force from forces locally available on the Kamchatka Peninsula and land on Shumshu within 48 hours.

Forces
The Imperial Japanese Army's 91st Division garrisoned both Shumshu and nearby Paramushiro, with about 8,500 troops on Shumshu and 15,000 more troops on Paramushiro. The garrisons were able to reinforce one another if necessary. The Japanese fielded 77 tanks. Against this force, Gnechko was able to field two reinforced Soviet Army rifle divisions and a Soviet Naval Infantry battalion with a combined total of 8,824 officers and men and a naval task force of 64 small ships and craft to carry them to Shumshu. The Soviets had no tanks and no major warships to commit to the operation, but enjoyed an advantage in artillery and mortars.

Planning
Gnechko requested and received a 24-hour postponement, which moved the landing requirement to no later than the evening of 18 August 1945.

Although Soviet intelligence reports indicated that the Japanese troops on Shumshu were demoralized by Japanese Emperor Hirohitos announcement on 15 August 1945 that Japan intended to surrender, Gnechko believed that the Japanese advantage in numbers could put the operation in jeopardy. Chronically poor weather in the area limited the ability of Soviet aircraft to conduct reconnaissance or provide support to a landing, but they were tasked to attack Paramushiros naval base to interdict Japanese reinforcements attempting to reach Shumshu.

Gnechko also feared that his force lacked sufficient artillery and naval gunfire support for its initial landing. The ships of the landing force had few large guns – the largest of them, the minesweeper Okhotsk, had only one 130-mm (5.1-inch) and two 76.2-mm (3-inch) guns – and he doubted the Soviet Navys ability to provide enough gunfire support to counter Japanese coastal artillery; moreover he and Ponomarev doubted the ability of the small ships available to remain on station and provide effective shore bombardment while both under fire from Japanese coastal batteries and fighting strong currents in the First Kuril Strait.

Gnechko planned to rely on four 130-mm (5.1-inch) guns on Cape Lopatka on the southern tip of the Kamchatka Peninsula to provide additional artillery support by firing 12 km (7.5 statute miles) across the First Kuril Strait against targets on Shumshu, but saw it as critical that Soviet infantry quickly establish a beachhead deep and secure enough to allow Soviet ships to unload artillery and mortars at Shumshu itself; he believed that only then would the Soviet advantage in artillery begin to express itself. However, the Soviet ground forces to be committed had little or no experience in amphibious warfare and little time for familiarization with Shumshu itself, and this, too, threatened the Soviet ability to establish the necessary beachhead. Gnechko hoped that by focusing the landing force in a concentrated attack on a small area, he could overcome these difficulties and establish a secure beachhead on which the Soviets could deploy artillery and mortars quickly.

On the Japanese side, the 91st Infantry Division did not expect a Soviet attack. However, the Kurils had been a Japanese possession since 1875, and Japanese forces had garrisoned them throughout World War II, giving them great familiarity with the terrain. Nearby Paramushiro had been the major Japanese base in the North Pacific during the war, and Japanese coastal artillery was sited to defend against amphibious assaults on Shumshu. Japanese forces fighting the Soviets elsewhere in Northeast Asia had demonstrated an ability to put up a spirited defense, despite Japan's announced intention to surrender and the cessation of hostilities with the other Allies as of 15 August 1945.

Landings

The Soviet landing force left Petropavlovsk-Kamchatsky at 05:00 on 17 August 1945 and, after a 21-hour voyage, arrived in the First Kuril Strait at 02:00 on 18 August 1945 and took up positions for the landings on Shumshu. The first wave of about 1,000 naval infantrymen went ashore at 04:30 on 18 August 1945. Completely surprised, the Japanese mounted a disorganized defense, but the Soviets were unable to exploit this properly; inexperienced in amphibious landings, the naval infantrymen indulged in uncoordinated advances inland instead of focusing on the primary objective of establishing a secure beachhead of sufficient depth to bring artillery and mortars ashore. By 05:30, the Japanese had manned machine guns in pillboxes and foxholes and begun to inflict heavy casualties on the Soviets. The Soviets also took too long to begin their assaults against Japanese coastal artillery positions, which the Japanese defended fiercely. At 06:00, some Soviet units of the first wave finally attempted an attack on the Japanese batteries on Cape Kokutan, but were too outnumbered to breach the defenses. The Soviets held off a Japanese counterattack by infantry and 20 tanks, destroying 15 of the tanks, and then charged up the heights toward the artillery sites, but were repulsed near the top.

Japanese coastal artillery soon found the range against Soviet ships. Almost completely lacking radio communication with the troops ashore, the Soviet ships attempts at naval gunfire support were ineffective. When the Soviet second wave headed for shore at 05:30, led by 16 ex-U.S. Navy large infantry landing craft (LCI(L)s – now redesignated as desantiye suda) (DS, or "landing ship") – Japanese artillery laid down heavy fire against it. By the time it had finished unloading the second wave at 09:00, Japanese artillery fire had destroyed five landing ships – DS-1 (ex-), DS-5 (ex-), DS-9 (ex-), DS-43 (ex-), and DS-47 (ex-). The Soviet second wave came ashore without its artillery and mortars and with few of its radios.

At same time, a Soviet minesweeper KT-152 was sunk near Shumshu. It is believed to have been attacked by a kamikaze plane.

At 09:10, Soviet forces on Shumshu – badly in need of reinforcements and supplies – finally established radio contact with the ships offshore and with the four guns on Cape Lopatka. The gunfire from Cape Lopatka was particularly effective, and the Soviet troops held out against repeated Japanese counterattacks. By the afternoon, with the weather improving, Soviet aircraft began to attack the naval base on Paramushiro to prevent Japanese reinforcements from reaching Shumshu, and the Soviets had established good communications between their troops ashore, gunfire support ships, and Soviet aircraft, which combined to inflict heavy casualties on counterattacking Japanese. By the evening of 18 August 1945, the Soviets had established a beachhead 4 km (2.5 miles) wide and 5 to 6 km (3.1 to 3.75 miles) deep and had managed to bring artillery and mortars ashore.

Killed while silencing a Japanese machine-gun position on Shumshu on 18 August 1945, Soviet Naval Infantry Petty Officer First Class Nikolai Aleksandrovich Vilkov posthumously received the Hero of the Soviet Union award.

Conclusion of operation
In a series of attacks during the night of 18–19 August 1945, the Soviets wiped out most of the defenses of the Japanese shore batteries, and Gnechko made plans to bring all Japanese resistance on Shumshu to an end on 19 August. Soviet heavy artillery came ashore on the morning of 19 August, and small groups of Japanese began to surrender. At 09:00, a Japanese envoy informed the Soviets that the 91st Infantry Division had received orders from higher command to cease hostilities at 16:00.

Japanese forces on Shumshu, Paramushiro, and Onekotan signed an unconditional surrender agreement at 18:00 on 19 August 1945. However, fighting on Shumshu continued to flare up until 23 August 1945, when the last Japanese on the island finally surrendered.

Results
The Battle of Shumshu was the only battle between the Soviets and Japanese in August–September 1945 in which Soviet casualties exceeded those of the Japanese. The Soviets suffered 1,567 casualties – 516 killed or missing and another 1,051 wounded – and the loss of five landing ships, while Japanese casualties totaled 1,018 – 256 killed and another 762 wounded. Soviet officers later often said that the operation demonstrated the difficulty of amphibious invasions of enemy territory and Soviet shortfalls and inexperience in amphibious warfare, and cited the Soviet experience on Shumshu as a reason for not invading the island of Hokkaido in the Japanese Home Islands.

With Shumshu and Paramushiro under Soviet control, the rest of the Kuril Island chain, much more lightly held by Japanese forces, fell to Soviet forces easily. The Soviets completed their occupation of the Kurils on 5 September 1945.

See also
 Manchurian Strategic Offensive Operation
 Soviet–Japanese War
 Invasion of South Sakhalin
 Project Hula

Footnotes

References
 
 ; source is a United States Navy publication in the public domain.

Japan campaign
Military operations involving the Soviet Union
Japan–Soviet Union relations
Kuril Islands
1945 in Japan
1945 in the Soviet Union
Conflicts in 1945
Naval operations and battles
August 1945 events in Asia